Oberea strigicollis is a species of beetle in the family Cerambycidae. It was described by Gressitt in 1942.

References

Beetles described in 1942
strigicollis